Eslamabad (also Romanized as Eslāmābād; also known as Eslāmābād-e Kamālī) is a village in Rizab Rural District, Qatruyeh District, Neyriz County, Fars Province, Iran. At the 2006 census, its population was 127, in 34 families.

References 

Populated places in Neyriz County